Art Lives (subtitled Recorded in Performance at The Maiden Voyage, Los Angeles) is a live album by saxophonist Art Pepper recorded in 1981 at the Maiden Voyage nightclub in Los Angeles and released on the Galaxy label.

Reception

The AllMusic review by Scott Yanow noted "Pepper, pianist George Cables, bassist David Williams, and drummer Carl Burnett are heard at their best on "Allen's Alley" and "Samba Mom Mom." A special highlight is a passionate duet by Pepper and Cables on "But Beautiful."".

Track listing 
All compositions by Art Pepper except where noted.
 "Allen's Alley" (Denzil Best) - 10:36
 "Samba Mom Mom" - 10:39
 "But Beautiful" (Jimmy Van Heusen, the lyrics by Johnny Burke) - 8:43
 "Thank You Blues" - 13:34	
Recorded at the Maiden Voyage, in Los Angeles CA on August 13, 1981 (track 4) and August 15, 1981 (tracks 1-3)

Personnel 
Art Pepper - alto saxophone
George Cables - piano 
David Williams - bass (tracks 1, 2 & 4)
Carl Burnett - drums (tracks 1, 2 & 4)

References 

Art Pepper live albums
1983 live albums
Galaxy Records live albums